Micropentila is a genus of butterflies in the family Lycaenidae, endemic to the Afrotropics.

Species
Micropentila adelgitha (Hewitson, 1874)
Micropentila adelgunda (Staudinger, 1892)
Micropentila alberta (Staudinger, 1892)
Micropentila bakotae Stempffer & Bennett, 1965
Micropentila bitjeana Stempffer & Bennett, 1965
Micropentila brunnea (Kirby, 1887)
Micropentila bunyoro Stempffer & Bennett, 1965
Micropentila catocala Strand, 1914
Micropentila cherereti Stempffer & Bennett, 1965
Micropentila cingulum Druce, 1910
Micropentila dorothea Bethune-Baker, 1903
Micropentila flavopunctata Stempffer & Bennett, 1965
Micropentila fontainei Stempffer & Bennett, 1965
Micropentila fulvula Hawker-Smith, 1933
Micropentila fuscula (Grose-Smith, 1898)
Micropentila gabunica Stempffer & Bennett, 1965
Micropentila galenides (Holland, 1895)
Micropentila jacksoni Talbot, 1937
Micropentila katangana Stempffer & Bennett, 1965
Micropentila katerae Stempffer & Bennett, 1965
Micropentila kelleana Stempffer & Bennett, 1965
Micropentila mabangi Bethune-Baker, 1904
Micropentila mamfe Larsen, 1986
Micropentila mpigi Stempffer & Bennett, 1965
Micropentila nigeriana Stempffer & Bennett, 1965
Micropentila ogojae Stempffer & Bennett, 1965
Micropentila sankuru Stempffer & Bennett, 1965
Micropentila souanke Stempffer & Bennett, 1965
Micropentila subplagata Bethune-Baker, 1915
Micropentila triangularis Aurivillius, 1895
Micropentila ugandae Hawker-Smith, 1933
Micropentila victoriae Stempffer & Bennett, 1965
Micropentila villiersi Stempffer, 1970

References

Poritiinae
Taxa named by Per Olof Christopher Aurivillius
Lycaenidae genera